The Star Awards for Top 10 Most Popular Female Artistes is an award presented annually at the Star Awards, a ceremony that was established in 1994. Initially, the awards were 10 Most Popular Artistes with five male and five female artistes receiving it. In 1997, the award winners were increased to ten female artistes from five.

History
The category was introduced in 1994, at the first Star Awards ceremony ; Chen Liping, Chen Xiuhuan, Pan Lingling, Aileen Tan, and Zoe Tay received the award as five of the female artistes of the 10 Most Popular Artistes award. The winners are determined by a majority vote from the public via telephone and SMS text voting.

During 1994 and 1995, the Most Popular Actress award and Most Popular Actress were also awarded. It was a separate award from the 10 Most Popular Artistes award and was given out to the female artiste who topped the votes of the latter award. Tay won the award in both 1994 and 1995. In 1996, the Most Popular Actress award was retired, making Tay the only recipient of this award.

Since 1997, the number of recipients for each category were expanded to ten and the award was renamed as Top 10 Most Popular Female Artistes.

In 2017, the award nominees were increased from 20 to 24, where four artistes were eliminated after the prelude shows while the other 20 continue to compete in the category in the week leading up to the main ceremony.

In 2021, the award nominees was increased from 20 to 30 which means the competition was even more intense for the artistes, who missed out on their glamour night out when the 2020 event was suspended due to the COVID-19 pandemic.

Since the ceremony held in 2022, Ann Kok, Yvonne Lim, and Jesseca Liu remain as the only female artistes to have the most wins without achieving the All-Time Favourite Artiste award, with nine. Felicia Chin is the first and only female artiste who had nine wins to fail to win in the year she was nominated for her tenth and final award (she eventually won her tenth and final award in 2022). Carrie Wong is currently the only female artiste who holds a winning streak that is uninterrupted since her first nomination. In addition, Pan has been nominated on 25 occasions, more than any other female artiste. Priscelia Chan, Hong Huifang and Lin Meijiao hold the record for the most nominations without a win, with 12 (Hong eventually won her first award in 2019).

Eligibility
Before 1997, only Mediacorp actresses were eligible to be nominated for the award. This rule was removed in 1997 onwards to allow the Mediacorp female artistes from the variety sector to contest for the award.

In 2018, the rules were changed to allow contracted and project-based artistes to be nominated and/or receive the award.

13 female artistes have received the award for ten times and were given the All-Time Favourite Artiste award, and are no longer eligible for the running of the award. Amongst them are Zoe Tay, Fann Wong, Rui En, and Rebecca Lim who have all won in this category for ten consecutive times since their first nomination.

Recipients
Since its inception, the award has been given to 46 female artistes. Felicia Chin, Paige Chua, Hong Ling, Cynthia Koh, Rebecca Lim, Yvonne Lim, Jesseca Liu, Chantalle Ng, Carrie Wong, and Ya Hui are the most recent winners in this category.

Award records

References

External links 

Star Awards